Sometimes Chimes is an album by the band Further released in 1994.

Track listing

References

1993 albums